Midway is an unincorporated community in Crittenden County, Kentucky, United States.

Notes

Unincorporated communities in Crittenden County, Kentucky
Unincorporated communities in Kentucky